Al-Azzounieh is a village in Aley District in the Mount Lebanon Governorate of Lebanon. Its inhabitants are predominantly Druze.

References

Populated places in Aley District
Druze communities in Lebanon